Sean A. Gainey is a United States Army major general who serves as director of the Counter-Unmanned Aircraft Systems Office and director of fires. He previously served as the deputy director of fires of the Joint Staff.

In January 2023, Gainey was nominated for promotion to lieutenant general.

References

External links

Living people
United States Army generals
Year of birth missing (living people)